Allen Patrick (born February 15, 1984) is a former American football running back. He was drafted by the Baltimore Ravens in the seventh round of the 2008 NFL Draft. He played college football at Oklahoma.

Patrick has also been a member of the Cleveland Browns, New York Giants, Jacksonville Jaguars St. Louis Rams and Indianapolis Colts.

Early years
Patrick attended Conway High School in Conway, South Carolina where he played running back, defensive back, and kick returner.

College career

Independence Community College
Following high school, Patrick played for Independence Community College in Independence, Kansas. He played safety.

Oklahoma
Patrick then transferred to the University of Oklahoma and made the switch to running back. During the 2006 season, he was thrust into the starting lineup when starting tailback Adrian Peterson was lost for the season with a broken collarbone. He gained 761 yards on 169 carries in 2006, with a 4.5 yard-per-carry average and 4 touchdowns. In 2007, with Peterson gone to the NFL, Patrick gained 1,009 yards on 173 attempts and scored 8 touchdowns. Patrick finished his career with 1,906 total rushing yards and 14 rushing touchdowns.

Statistics

External links

Cleveland Browns bio
New York Giants bio
Jacksonville Jaguars bio
Oklahoma Sooners bio

1984 births
Living people
People from Conway, South Carolina
African-American players of American football
Players of American football from South Carolina
American football safeties
American football running backs
Oklahoma Sooners football players
Baltimore Ravens players
Cleveland Browns players
New York Giants players
Jacksonville Jaguars players
Indianapolis Colts players
St. Louis Rams players
Independence Pirates football players
21st-century African-American sportspeople
20th-century African-American people